Umoja Uaso ("unity" in Swahili, the Uaso Nyiro is a nearby river), is a village in Kenya. The village, founded in 1990, is an all-female matriarch village located near the town of Archers Post in Samburu County,  from the capital, Nairobi. It was founded by Rebecca Lolosoli, a Samburu woman, as a sanctuary for homeless survivors of violence against women, and young girls running from forced marriages or female genital mutilation. The women of the Samburu people do not agree with violence and the traditional subordinate position of women.

They run a primary school, cultural center and camping site for tourists visiting the adjacent Samburu National Reserve. They create and sell jewellery to benefit the village.

History
Samburu women have a subordinate position in their society. They are not allowed to own land or other types of property, such as livestock. Women themselves are considered property of their husbands. They can be subject to female genital mutilation, forced marriage with the elders, rape and domestic violence. Since then, a case was brought up against the British military for the rapes of over 1,400 Samburu women. The case was cleared.  These women were abandoned by their husbands because they were considered to be "defiled." Other men drove the women out of their houses fearing they would now contract sexually transmitted diseases from their raped wives.

After many women found themselves without homes, they created Umoja. Rebecca Lolosoli is one of the founders of Umoja, and came up with the idea of creating a village for women when she was recovering after being beaten for speaking out against female genital mutilation. Eventually fifteen women came together to found the original village in 1990.

In response, some men established their own, eventually unsuccessful villages nearby. The men tried to set up a rival craft business or would try to dissuade tourists from stopping at Umoja. The women eventually bought the land the men were occupying.

The villagers first started out by selling vegetables they bought from others, since they did not know how to farm themselves. This was not very successful, and the village turned to selling traditional crafts to tourists. The Kenya Wildlife Services took notice and helped the women learn from successful groups in areas such as the Maasai Mara, in order to improve Umoja's business. The women also had help from Kenya's Heritage and Social Services and the Ministry of Culture.

After Lolosoli visited the United Nations in 2005, men in the neighboring village filed a court case against her, hoping to shut down the village. In 2009, Lolosoli's former husband attacked the village, threatening her life. For a time, the women fled the village for their safety.

The women of the village currently own the land itself. As of 2021, the village's application for a community title over a tract of grazing land is undergoing government consideration.

Geography and demographics

Umoja is located in north-central Kenya in Samburu County, near Archers Post. The village is made up of manyata huts built from a mixture of earth and cow dung on an abandoned grassland. The houses are surrounded by a fence of thorns and barbed wire.

The people of the village have an objective to "improve the livelihoods of women due to rampant poverty and counter the problem of women being abandoned by their families." The village also takes in runaways or girls who have been thrown out of their households, and raises orphans, abandoned children and children with HIV. The village has also provided asylum for women fleeing violence from the Turkana District.

Residents in the community must all wear the traditional clothing and beadwork of the Samburu people. Female genital mutilation is outlawed in the village.

Population
Men are permitted to visit the village, but not allowed to live in Umoja. As of 2015, one man visited the village daily to do work tending to livestock. Boys raised in the village are asked to leave when they reach age eighteen. Only men who were raised as children in Umoja may sleep in the village. 

Some women flee to Umoja with children they already have. Many have children while living in the village and seeing men from outside; having children is seen as desirable, even when out of wedlock. The village also takes in orphans, runaways, and abandoned children. In 2005, there were 30 women and 50 children living in Umoja. As of 2015, there were 47 women and 200 children living in the village.

Economy
Residents of Umoja are engaged in traditional Samburu crafts which they sell at the Umoja Waso Women's Cultural Center. Crafts include colorful beads, a home-brewed low-alcohol beer analogue and more. The items are also available on a website. The women also run a campsite for tourists visiting the nearby Samburu National Reserve. Every woman donates ten percent of her earnings to the village as a tax to support the school and other needs.

The village suffered lack of income in 2020 due to the COVID-19 pandemic.

Education 
In traditional society, children are engaged in tending livestock, but in Umoja, all children can get an education. There is a primary school that can accommodate 50 children. The village has also been able to open a nursery school.

Residents of the village go to other villages to promote women's rights and in order to campaign against female circumcision.

Government
The women of the village gather under the "tree of speech" to make decisions for the town. Lolosoli serves as the chairperson of the village. All women in the village have equal status to one another.

See also

Women only space
Umoja: The Village Where Men Are Forbidden
Jinwar, a village run along similar lines in northern Syria

References

External links
 Official website of the film "Umoja, the village where men are forbidden"
The Land of No Men: Inside Kenya's Women-Only Village (2015 video)
Kenya : le village où les femmes font la loi — rfr

Populated places in Samburu County
Women-only spaces
Women in Kenya
Populated places established in 1990
1990 establishments in Kenya
Violence against women in Kenya
Feminism in Kenya